Faustine Engelbert Ndugulile (born 31 March 1969) is a Tanzanian CCM politician and Member of Parliament for Kigamboni constituency since 2010.

Dr. Faustine Ndugulile was appointed Deputy Minister of the Ministry of Health, Community Development, Gender, Elders and Children (Tanzania)  by the President of the United Republic of Tanzania, Dr. John Pombe Joseph Magufuli in October 2017.

After the 2020 Tanzanian General Election, on December 5, 2020, in Magufuli's second cabinet he was appointed as the first Minister of Communication & ICT, a newly created ministry.  currently under president Samia Suluhu Hassan

References

1969 births
Living people
Chama Cha Mapinduzi MPs
Tanzanian MPs 2010–2015
Tanzanian medical doctors
Alumni of Prince Edward School
Tambaza Secondary School alumni
Muhimbili University of Health and Allied Sciences alumni
University of the Western Cape alumni
Open University of Tanzania alumni
Tanzanian Roman Catholics